KriArj Entertainment was an Indian motion picture production company founded by Prerna Arora. The first film under this banner was the 2016 period drama film Rustom, starring Akshay Kumar and Ileana D'Cruz. It was followed by the comedy drama's Toilet: Ek Prem Katha (2017), Pad Man (2018) and the horror film Pari (2018). The name of the company is an amalgamation of Krishna and Arjuna, a reference to their spiritual dialog in the Bhagavad Gita.Last venture produced by company was Fanney Khan.

Productions

Defunct
There were some controversies surrounding the production house being part of the projects like Parmanu: The Story of Pokhran, Kedarnath, Batti Gul Meter Chalu and Fanney Khan but not much came in the public place. The production house was called off in 2018 with its last production venture  Fanney Khan.

References

Film production companies based in Mumbai
Indian companies established in 2016
2016 establishments in Maharashtra
Mass media companies established in 2016